Labib is a masculine Arabic name. Notable people with the name include:

Given name
 Labib Habachi (1906–1984), Egyptian Egyptologist
 Labib Hussein Abu Rokan  (1911–1989), Israeli politician
Labiba Hashim (1882 - 1952) Lebanese novelist
Labib al-Fata al-Saqlabi (1009/1010 - 1039/1040), founder and first ruler of the Taifa of Tortosa
Labib Mahmoud (190U - Unknown), Egyptian footballer
Labib Hasso (1925 - before 2008) was an Iraqi sprinter

Surname
 Adel Labib, Egyptian politician
 Pahor Labib (1905–1994), Egyptian Egyptologist
Claudius Labib (1868–1918), Egyptian Egyptologist

Other 
 Labib (mascot), the former official mascot of the environment in Tunisia

Arabic-language surnames
Arabic masculine given names